The  is the name of Japanese aerial lift line in Ikeda, Tokushima, as well as its operator. The line climbs Mount Hashikura of Hashikura-dera, a famous temple.

Refurbished in 1999, this is the first funitel to be operated in Asia. As of October 2007, there are three other funitel lines in Japan. However, all other lines are funitel gondola lifts, while Hashikurasan Ropeway is the only funitel aerial tramway.

History
The route to Hashikura-dera was originally linked by a funicular railway called , opened in 1930. The line closed in 1944. In 1971, Shikoku Cable opened a chairlift running on the former funicular line route, as well as an aerial tramway that links the chairlift terminus and the temple. Another aerial tramway opened along the chairlift line in 1977. In 1999, two aerial tramways were refurbished into one funitel line, eliminating the need of transfer.

Basic data
System: Funitel
Cable length: 
Vertical interval: 
Operational speed: 5.0 m/s
Passenger capacity per a cabin: 32
Cabins: 2
Stations: 2

See also
List of aerial lifts in Japan

External links
 Official website

Aerial tramways in Japan
Tourist attractions in Tokushima Prefecture
Transport in Tokushima Prefecture